The following Union Army units and commanders fought in the Battle of Prairie Grove of the American Civil War on December 7, 1862, in Washington County, Arkansas.  The Confederate order of battle is listed separately.

Abbreviations used

Military rank
 MG = Major General
 BG = Brigadier General
 Col = Colonel
 Ltc = Lieutenant Colonel
 Maj = Major
 Cpt = Captain

Other
 w = wounded
 mw = mortally wounded
 k = killed

Army of the Frontier

MG James G. Blunt
9,216 men on the battlefield

Notes

References

External links
 ”Battle of Prairie Grove: Civilian Recollections of the Civil War”, a National Park Service Teaching with Historic Places (TwHP) lesson plan
 Battle of Prairie Grove - Information and battlefield pictures
 Community & Conflict:  The Impact of the Civil War In the Ozarks
 Edward G. Gerdes Civil War Home Page
 The Encyclopedia of Arkansas History and Culture
 The War of the Rebellion: a Compilation of the Official Records of the Union and Confederate Armies
 The Arkansas History Commission, State Archives, Civil War in Arkansas

American Civil War orders of battle
Military units and formations in Arkansas
Prairie Grove Campaign